Hemibagrus nemurus is a species of catfishes (order Siluriformes) of the genus Hemibagrus in the family Bagridae.  After a major review by Ng and Kottelat (2013), its distribution is believed to be confined (endemic) to Java. It is found in Sumatra in the Bukit Tigapuluh National Park in 2016, too. These catfish are found in Malaysia , Indonesia , Java , Sumatra , Borneo and Thailand . In Malaysia and Indonesia , they are called ikan Baung while Malaysian Chinese call these catfish 白须公 or 白叔公 (translated by Cantonese ) which means white whiskered man because of their white whiskers .They are common food fish in Malaysia and Indonesia , they are either steamed or cooked in curry .

References

External links 
 IUCN Red List:  Hemibagrus nemurus, accessed 15/XII/2017
 Planet Catfish: Hemibagrus nemurus, accessed  15/XII/2017

Fish of Indonesia
Bagridae
Fish described in 1840